Paavo Johannes Aitio (14 July 1918 Turku - 1 June 1989 Turku) was a Finnish politician who served as a Member of the Finnish People's Democratic League (SKDL) (1951–1977), Minister in two governments and Governor of Turku and Pori (1977–1985). He was a candidate for the SKDL in the 1962 presidential election. He was elected to the parliament of Finland in 1956.

After his retirement from politics, Aitio was named an honorary professor of political science by the University of Turku in 1980.

References

1918 births
1989 deaths
Finnish People's Democratic League politicians
Members of the Parliament of Finland (1951–54)